The 1981 German Formula Three Championship was a multi-event motor racing championship for single-seat open wheel formula racing cars held across Europe. The championship featured drivers competing in two-litre Formula Three racing cars which conformed to the technical regulations, or formula, for the championship. It commenced on 29 March at Nürburgring and ended at the same place on 20 September after eleven rounds.

Bertram Schäfer Racing driver Frank Jelinski had successfully defended his championship crown. He won races at Wunstorf, Erding and Nürburgring. Franz Konrad lost in the title battle just by three points. Stefan Bellof completed the top-three in the drivers standings with wins at Diepholz, Hockenheim and Siegerland. Peter Schindler and 1981 FIA European Formula 3 Championship driver Oscar Larrauri were the only other drivers who won race in the season.

Teams and drivers

Calendar

Results

Championship standings
Points are awarded as follows:

References

External links
 

German Formula Three Championship seasons
Formula Three season